The 2010–11 Ligat Nashim was the 13th season of women's league football under the Israeli Football Association.

The league was won by ASA Tel Aviv University, its second consecutive title and third overall. By winning, ASA Tel Aviv qualified to 2011–12 UEFA Women's Champions League.

For the first time since the establishment of Ligat Nashim, a second division was established, competed by 5 clubs. Hapoel Be'er Sheva won the division and was promoted to Ligat Nashim Rishona.

Format changes
For the first time since its establishment, the league was divided into two tiers, with 8 clubs in the first division (called Ligat Nashim Rishona, lit. First Women's League) and 5 in the second division (called Ligat Nashim Shniya, lit. Second Women's League).

In the first division, the participating clubs first played a conventional round-robin schedule for a total of 14 rounds, after which the 4 top clubs played a championship play-off, while the bottom 4 clubs played a relegation play-off, with clubs in each group playing a round-robin schedule of another 6 matches between them. Points earned in the regular season were kept by the clubs.
The top club at the Championship Group would win the championship and qualify to 2011–12 UEFA Women's Champions League, while the bottom club at the Relegation Group would relegate to Ligat Nashim Shniya and the second-bottom club in the Relegation Group would compete in a promotion/relegation play-off against the second placed team from Ligat Nashim Shniya.

Ligat Nashim Rishona

Regular season

Championship group

Relegation group

Promotion/relegation play-off

Top scorers

Ligat Nashim Shniya

Format
The participating in this division played a double round-robin schedule for a total of 16 rounds, with the top club promoting to Ligat Nashim Rishona.

League table

Top scorers

References
Ligat Nashim Rishona @IFA
Ligat Nashim Shniya @IFA

Ligat Nashim seasons
1
women
Israel